Eupithecia sucidata is a moth in the family Geometridae. It is found in Jamaica.

References

Moths described in 1886
sucidata
Moths of the Caribbean